Remote is a 2004 Tamil language action drama film directed by Karvannan, his last directorial before his death. The film featured Napoleon in the lead role, with several newcomers in supporting roles. The film had a musical score by Paanabhadran and was released on 26 December 2004. The impact and aftermath of the 2004 Indian Ocean earthquake and tsunami meant that the film had a brief run in theatres. The film was later dubbed and released in Hindi as Time Limit 36 Hours.

Cast
Napoleon
Anamika
Kadhal Sukumar
Kadhir
Kalpana Sri
Renuka
Vendhan
Harris
Jaykumar
Nasreen
Rajkumar
Revali Kumar
Bonda Mani
amirunnisha gunasegaran
Lollu Sabha Seshu

Soundtrack

The film score and the soundtrack were composed by Paanabhadran. The soundtrack, released in 2004, features 4 tracks.

References

2004 films
2000s Tamil-language films
Indian action thriller films
2004 action thriller films